Laura Kipnis is an American cultural critic and essayist. Her work focuses on sexual politics, gender issues, aesthetics, popular culture, and pornography. She began her career as a video artist, exploring similar themes in the form of video essays. She is professor of media studies at Northwestern University in the Department of Radio-TV-Film, where she teaches filmmaking. In recent years she has become known for debating sexual harassment and free speech policies in higher education.

Career
Kipnis was born in Chicago, Illinois. She earned a Bachelor of Fine Arts at the San Francisco Art Institute and a Master of Fine Arts from Nova Scotia College of Art and Design. She also studied at the Whitney Museum Independent Study Studio Program. She has received fellowships for her work from the Guggenheim Foundation, the Rockefeller Foundation, the Michigan Society of Fellows, and the National Endowment for the Arts. She has been assistant professor, associate professor, and is now full professor at Northwestern University. She taught previously at the University of Wisconsin-Madison, and as a visiting professor at the School of the Art Institute of Chicago, New York University, Columbia University School of the Arts, and the University of British Columbia.

Work
In her 2003 book Against Love: A Polemic, a "ragingly witty yet contemplative look at the discontents of domestic and erotic relationships, Kipnis combines portions of the slashing sexual contrarianism of Mailer, the scathing antidomestic wit of early Roseanne Barr and the coolly analytical aesthetics of early Sontag."

In 2010 she published How to Become a Scandal: Adventures in Bad Behavior, which focused on scandal, including those of Eliot Spitzer, Linda Tripp, James Frey, Sol Wachtler, and Lisa Nowak; the book examined "the elaborate ways those transgressors reassure themselves that they are not bringing colossal ruin upon themselves, that their dalliances will never see the light of day". "What allows for scandal in Kipnis's schema is every individual's blind spot, "a little existential joke on humankind (or in some cases, a ticking time bomb) nestled at the core of every lonely consciousness...Ostensibly about scandal, her book is most memorable as a convincing case for the ultimate unknowability of the self".

Her essays and reviews have appeared in Slate, Harper's, Playboy, The New York Times, The New York Review of Books, The Atlantic, The Guardian, and Bookforum.

Writings about sexual harassment policies
In March 2015, after Northwestern University professor Peter Ludlow had been accused of sexual harassment, Kipnis wrote an essay in the Chronicle of Higher Education in which she decried "sexual paranoia" on campuses and discussed professor-student sexual relationships and trigger warnings. The essay was later included in the Best American Essays of 2016, edited by Jonathan Franzen.

A group of students at Northwestern protested Kipnis's piece, demanding that the administration reaffirm its commitment to the sexual harassment policies that Kipnis criticized. In an opinion column for The Wall Street Journal, Northwestern University president Morton O. Schapiro referred to the protest and argued for maximum speech in such conflicted situations. Two students "took issue with the piece, saying Kipnis was describing a real-life scenario and that her facts were off. They accused Kipnis of retaliatory behavior and creating a hostile environment". They filed a complaint with Northwestern's Title IX office, arguing that her essay had a "chilling effect" on students' ability to report sexual harassment. The school opened an investigation into the case. Kipnis discussed the charges and details of the investigation of those complaints in an essay titled "My Title IX Inquisition," noting that her faculty support person had also been brought up on Title IX complaints over public statements about her case. Northwestern eventually exonerated her. Title IX complaints were also filed against Northwestern's President Schapiro over his Wall Street Journal column.

Kipnis's 2017 book, Unwanted Advances: Sexual Paranoia Comes to Campus discusses the Ludlow case and argues that sexual harassment policies do not empower women but rather impede the fight for gender equality. One of the students who had brought the Title IX complaints against Ludlow initiated a lawsuit naming Kipnis and her publisher, HarperCollins, alleging invasion of privacy and defamation. Kipnis has publicly stated, "In case there’s any confusion, Unwanted Advances remains in print and I stand by everything in the book." Unwanted Advances was named one of the Wall Street Journal'''s ten best non-fiction books of 2017. Jennifer Senior wrote in the New York Times, “Few people have taken on the excesses of university culture with the brio that Kipnis has. Her anger gives her argument the energy of a live cable.”

In addition to speaking on college campuses around the country about issues related to feminism, free speech, #MeToo, campus sexual politics, and gender equity, in 2017 Kipnis participated in a New York Times Magazine roundtable on the subject of "Work, Fairness, Sex and Ambition" together with Anita Hill and Soledad O’Brien. Kipnis said:Here’s a historical and political way of looking at the current moment. There have been, roughly speaking, two divergent tendencies in the struggle for women’s rights that come together in the issue of workplace harassment, which is why I think this all seems so significant. If you look at the history of feminism, going back to the 19th century, you’ve got, on the one hand, the struggle for what I’d call civic rights: the right to employment, the right to vote, to enter politics and public life. On the other side, there’s the struggle for women to have autonomy over our own bodies, meaning access to birth control, activism around rape, outlawing marital rape, and the fight for abortion rights. What we’re seeing now is the incomplete successes in both of these areas converging. We’ve never entirely attained civic equality. We’ve never entirely attained autonomy over our bodies. Which is why the right not to be sexually harassed in the workplace is the next important frontier in equality for women.

 New York Review of Books controversy 
Kipnis wrote, in a New York Times opinion piece "The Perils of Publishing in a #MeToo Moment" protesting the Books' firing of editor Ian Buruma: "One consequence of Mr. Buruma’s departure will be a new layer of safeguards we won’t even know are in place, including safeguards from the sort of intellectual risks The New York Review of Books always stood for."

Select bibliography

Books
 Ecstasy Unlimited: On Sex, Capital, Gender, and Aesthetics (Minneapolis, Minn.: University Of Minnesota Press, 1993)
 Bound and Gagged: Pornography and the Politics of Fantasy in America (New York: Grove Press, 1996)
 Against Love: A Polemic (New York: Pantheon Books, 2003)
 The Female Thing: Dirt, Sex, Envy, Vulnerability (New York: Pantheon Books, 2006)
 How to Become a Scandal: Adventures in Bad Behavior (New York: Metropolitan Books, 2010)
 Men: Notes from an Ongoing Investigation (New York: Metropolitan Books, 2014)
 Unwanted Advances: Sexual Paranoia Comes to Campus (New York: HarperCollins, April 2017)

Essays

 
 
 
 
 
 
 
 
 
 
 
 
 
 
 
 
 
 
 
 
 
 
 
 
 "The Perils of Publishing in a #MeToo Moment". The New York Times. 25 September 2018.
 "Why Are Scholars Such Snitches?", Chronicle of Higher Education, March 17, 2022

Reviews
 
 
 
 
 
 
 
 
 
 
 

References

Bibliography
 
 
 
 

External links
 "Laura Kipnis" Laura Kipnis's Website, www.LauraKipnis.com.
 "Laura Kipnis" (faculty page), School of Communication at Northwestern University.
 Laura Kipnis on twitter
 Laura Kipnis on the 7th Avenue Project radio show discussing masculinity and her book "Men: Notes from an Ongoing Investigation" 
 Laura Kipnis in the Video Data Bank
 "Laura Kipnis Biography", Electronic Arts Intermix (website). – Biographical info circa 1988.
 "An Interview with Laura Kipnis" by Jeffrey J. Williams, Minnesota Review''.
 Laura Kipnis on "Eight Books That Made Me" podcast

American feminist writers
Feminist studies scholars
1956 births
Living people
American women essayists
Mass media theorists
Sex-positive feminists
Jewish American writers
Jewish women writers
American women critics
University of Michigan fellows
Northwestern University faculty
NSCAD University alumni
San Francisco Art Institute alumni
20th-century American essayists
21st-century American essayists
20th-century American women writers
21st-century American women writers
Writers from Chicago
American women academics
21st-century American Jews